Ojarud-e Shomali Rural District is in the Central District of Germi County, Ardabil province, Iran. At the census of 2006, its population was 4,041 in 771 households; there were 3,528 inhabitants in 877 households at the following census of 2011; and in the most recent census of 2016, the population of the rural district was 2,832 in 802 households. The largest of its 30 villages was Shakar Ab, with 311 people.

References 

Germi County

Rural Districts of Ardabil Province

Populated places in Ardabil Province

Populated places in Germi County